Queen Anne's lace is a common name for a number of plants in the family Apiaceae.
including:
 Ammi majus, native in the Nile River Valley
 Anthriscus sylvestris, a herbaceous biennial or short-lived perennial plant
 Daucus carota, native to temperate Eurasia and naturalized in Australia and North America; the wild form of the domesticated carrot